Stanpark was the name of a number of ships operated by the Stanhope Steamship Co Ltd.

 
 

Ship names